After the fact is an idiom meaning too late, or after something is finished

It may also refer to:
After the Fact (album) 1982 album by the band Magazine
Ex post facto law, a law that retroactively changes the legal consequences of an action
A posteriori, a Latin phrase referring to the epistemological concept of deriving knowledge from past experience
"After the Fact", a song by the Player Piano from the album Satellite